Rose-Marie Perreault is a Canadian actress. She is most noted for her performance in the film Fake Tattoos (Les Faux tatouages), for which she received a Prix Iris nomination for Revelation of the Year at the 20th Quebec Cinema Awards in 2018, and a Canadian Screen Award nomination for Best Actress at the 7th Canadian Screen Awards in 2019.

She has appeared in the films The Demons (Les Démons), La Bolduc, When Love Digs a Hole (Quand l'amour se creuse un trou), The Fall of the American Empire (La chute de l'empire américain), Genesis (Genèse), We Are Gold (Nous sommes Gold), Before We Explode (Avant qu'on explose), Target Number One, Flashwood, The Marina (La Marina), A Revision (Une révision) and Dusk for a Hitman (Crépuscule pour un tueur). She also played Arielle Nelson in the Québécois TV series Clash, which aired for three years (2018–2021) on Canadian networks Super Écran and Vrak.

References

External links

Canadian film actresses
Canadian television actresses
Actresses from Quebec
French Quebecers
Living people
Year of birth missing (living people)